Karl Bringmann is a German theoretical computer scientist. He is currently senior researcher at Max Planck Institute for Informatics.

Biography
Bringmann earned his doctorate from Saarland University under the supervision of Kurt Mehlhorn.

In 2019, Bringmann received the Presburger Award from the European Association of Theoretical Computer Science for his work on lower bounds.

References

German computer scientists
Living people
Year of birth missing (living people)